Coralie Balmy (born 8 June 1987) is a French freestyle swimmer. Balmy was born in La Trinité, Martinique. She won her first senior title at the 2008 European Aquatics Championships in Eindhoven in the 4 × 200 m relay freestyle. At the same Championships she won the silver medal in the 400 m freestyle with the time of 4:04.15, all-time fourth fastest behind Federica Pellegrini's world record. At the 2008 Summer Olympics in Beijing, she finished fourth in the 400 m freestyle final. On 6 December 2008 she set the world record for the 200 m freestyle (short course) at the French National Championships in Angers, France in a time of 1:53.16. At the 2012 Summer Olympics her 4 × 200 m freestyle team won the bronze medal in a time of 7:47.49. The split times: Camille Muffat (1:55.51); Charlotte Bonnet (1:57.78); Ophélie-Cyrielle Étienne (1:58.05); Coralie Balmy (1:56.15).
Achievements
2007: SC European Championships
 3rd 200 m freestyle (1:54.43)
2008: LC European Championships
 1st 4×200 m freestyle (7:52.09)
 2nd 400 m freestyle (4:04.15)

See also
World record progression 200 metres freestyle

References

External links 

 
 
 
 

1987 births
Living people
Martiniquais swimmers
Olympic swimmers of France
Swimmers at the 2008 Summer Olympics
Swimmers at the 2012 Summer Olympics
Swimmers at the 2016 Summer Olympics
French people of Martiniquais descent
People from La Trinité, Martinique
World record setters in swimming
French female freestyle swimmers
Olympic bronze medalists for France
Olympic bronze medalists in swimming
Medalists at the FINA World Swimming Championships (25 m)
European Aquatics Championships medalists in swimming
Medalists at the 2012 Summer Olympics
Knights of the Ordre national du Mérite
World Aquatics Championships medalists in swimming
Universiade medalists in swimming
Mediterranean Games silver medalists for France
Mediterranean Games medalists in swimming
Swimmers at the 2009 Mediterranean Games
Universiade silver medalists for France
Medalists at the 2007 Summer Universiade